The Maid-Rite Sandwich Shop in Springfield, Illinois, is one of the few remaining early Maid-Rite franchises in the United States. This specific shop, built in 1921, claims to have the first drive-thru window in the U.S.  The building, along historic U.S. Route 66, was added to the National Register of Historic Places in 1984.

Notes

Buildings and structures in Springfield, Illinois
National Register of Historic Places in Springfield, Illinois
Commercial buildings completed in 1921
U.S. Route 66 in Illinois
Tourist attractions along U.S. Route 66
Tourist attractions in Springfield, Illinois
Restaurants in Illinois
Commercial buildings on the National Register of Historic Places in Illinois
Diners on the National Register of Historic Places
Diners in Illinois
1921 establishments in Illinois